Hoàng Cầm (22 February 1922 – 6 May 2010) was pen name of Bùi Tằng Việt, a Vietnamese poet, playwright, and novelist. He is best remembered for his poems such as Bên kia sông Đuống, Lá diêu bông or the plays Kiều Loan and Hận Nam Quan. Being involved in the Nhân Văn affair, Hoàng Cầm retreated from the Vietnam Writers' Association in 1958, later in 2007 he was awarded the National Prize for Literature and Art by the Government of Vietnam.

History
Bùi Tằng Việt was born in 1922 in the Việt Yên District, Bắc Giang to a scholar who came from the Song Hồ commune, Thuận Thành, Bắc Ninh. Graduated from the Thăng Long High School in Hanoi, Bùi Tằng Việt began his career as a writer and translator for the Tân dân xã publishing house which was owned by Vũ Đình Long, from that time he chose the pen name Hoàng Cầm which is the Vietnamese name of a fundamental herb in Traditional Chinese medicine.

In 1944, due to the tense condition of the war, Hoàng Cầm returned to his hometown Thuận Thành and participated in the Việt Minh movement. After the August Revolution, Hoàng Cầm once again went to Hanoi and found a theatre company named Đông Phương. He began to organize cultural activities for the Vietnam People's Army from 1952 in the position of the Director of the Public Performing Company (Văn công) of the General Department of Politics. After the First Indochina War, Hoàng Cầm worked for the Vietnam Writers' Association from which he soon withdrew in 1958 because of his involvement in the Nhân Văn affair. In March 2007, Hoàng Cầm was awarded the National Prize for Literature and Art by the Government of Vietnam. He died on 6 May 2010 in Hanoi at the age of 88.

Works
 Hận ngày xanh (1940)
 Bông sen trắng (1940)
 Cây đèn thần (1941)
 Thoi mộng (1941)
 Tỉnh giấc mơ vua (1942)
 Hận Nam Quan (1944, 1942)
 Bốn truyện ngắn (1939–1943)
 Kiều Loan (1945)
 Ông cụ Liên (1952)
 99 tình khúc (1955)
 Tiếng hát quan họ (1956)
 Đêm Lào Cai (1957)
 Những niềm tin (1965)
 Men đá vàng (truyện thơ, 1989)
 Bên kia sông Đuống (1993)
 Lá diêu bông (1993)
 Về Kinh Bắc (1994)
 Tương lai (kịch thơ, 1995)

References

Vietnamese novelists
Vietnamese male poets
Vietnamese dramatists and playwrights
1922 births
2010 deaths
Nhân Văn–Giai Phẩm affair
People from Bắc Ninh province
20th-century Vietnamese poets
20th-century novelists
20th-century dramatists and playwrights
20th-century male writers
20th-century pseudonymous writers